Khelejan (also Romanized as Khelejān and Kheljān) is a village in Sard-e Sahra Rural District, in the Central District of Tabriz County, East Azerbaijan Province, Iran. At the 2006 census, its population was 6,354, in 1,679 families.

References 

Populated places in Tabriz County